This Land Is Mine is a 1943 American war drama film directed by Jean Renoir and written and produced by Dudley Nichols. Starring Charles Laughton, Maureen O'Hara and George Sanders, the film is set in the midst of World War II in an unspecified place in German-occupied Europe that appears similar to France. Laughton plays Albert Lory, a cowardly school teacher in a town "somewhere in Europe" who is drawn into advocating resistance through his love of his country and of his fellow teacher Louise Martin, portrayed by O'Hara.

The film is one of the more acclaimed of the war films of the era. It won the 1944 Academy Award for Best Sound Recording (Stephen Dunn). Having opened simultaneously in 72 theaters, the film set a record for gross receipts on an opening day upon its release on May 7, 1943.

Plot
Albert is an unmarried schoolmaster living with his dominating mother and secretly in love with his neighbour and fellow teacher Louise. Widely regarded as ineffectual, he embarrasses everybody by his panic during an Allied air raid. However, Louise is engaged to George, the head of the railway yard, who, like many in the town, believes that collaboration with the German occupation is the only logical course.

Her brother Paul, who works in the yard, is an active resister and, trying to kill the German commandant Major von Keller with a grenade, instead kills two German soldiers. After turning a blind eye to previous acts of resistance (such as a wrecked train) in the hope of preserving good relations with the town, von Keller must now act and takes 10 local hostages, saying they will be shot in a week if the guilty person who threw the grenade is not found. Albert's mother, jealous of Louise, tells George that it was Paul. George tells von Keller and then, in a crisis of conscience, shoots himself. Albert bursts in a minute later, furious at discovering his mother's treachery, and is found with George's corpse and gun.

Regarding it as a matter for the civilian courts, the Germans expect Albert to be condemned. When in his defense he starts an impassioned plea for resistance, the prosecutor requests an adjournment. That night, von Keller comes to his cell and offers a deal: If he will keep quiet next day, new forged evidence will acquit him. To emphasize the point, in the morning the 10 hostages (including his friend Professor Sorel) are shot beneath his window. Back in court, Albert is all the more eloquent in the cause of liberty and the jurors proclaim him innocent. Freed and back in his schoolroom, with a proud Louise by his side, he is reading to the boys the Declaration of the Rights of Man and of the Citizen when German soldiers come to take him away.

Cast
 Charles Laughton as Albert Lory
 Maureen O'Hara as Louise Martin
 George Sanders as George Lambert
 Walter Slezak as Major Erich von Keller
 Kent Smith as Paul Martin
 Una O'Connor as Mrs. Emma Lory
 Philip Merivale as Prof. Sorel
 Thurston Hall as Mayor Manville
 Ivan F. Simpson as Judge
 George Coulouris as Prosecutor
 Tommy Bond as Student
 Nancy Gates as Julie Grant
 John Donat as Edmund W. Lorraine

Themes
Though the prime purpose of the film is propaganda to strengthen Allied resolve in the fight against Nazism, critics at the time and since have noted that Nichols and Renoir adopt a distinctively nuanced approach. The Germans, with von Keller an eloquent advocate of the advantages for Europe of Nazi rule, are not shown as mere brutes. Nor are the French, apart from the few mental or physical resisters, shown as heroes battling tyranny. Instead, some readings suggest that, as in Renoir's previous films La Grande Illusion and La Règle du Jeu, class may be more significant than race or nationality. For example, James Morrison cites how the film blames the bourgeoisie, a few left-wing intellectuals excepted, for letting Hitler into power in 1933, for surrendering France in 1940 and for collaborating actively or passively.

This stance was confirmed by Renoir shortly after the film came out when, in a speech, he asserted that his recent films "breathed this breath of anti-Fascism" and were rooted in the experience of the Popular Front of 1936, which was "a magnificent exposition of human brotherhood".

Reception
In 1998, Jonathan Rosenbaum of the Chicago Reader included the film in his unranked list of the best American films not included on the AFI Top 100.

References

External links
 
 
 
 

1943 films
American drama films
American black-and-white films
Films directed by Jean Renoir
Films about the French Resistance
Films that won the Best Sound Mixing Academy Award
Films set in France
Films with screenplays by Dudley Nichols
American World War II propaganda films
1943 drama films
1940s English-language films